The Hidden Power of the Dragon Sabre is a 1984 Hong Kong wuxia film directed by Chor Yuen and produced by the Shaw Brothers Studio. The film is a spinoff of Louis Cha's novel The Heaven Sword and Dragon Saber.

Plot
The film is a spin-off of the original story of The Heaven Sword and Dragon Saber. Zhang Wuji retrieves the Heaven-reliant Sword and the Dragon-slaying Saber and places them in the Ming Cult's headquarters. He carves the inscriptions from the Nine Yang Manual on the walls of a secret chamber and asks his godfather Xie Xun, who has become a monk, to help him guard the chamber. Zhang returns the original copy of the manual to the Shaolin School.

Song Qingshu, a defeated villain from the original story, returns and starts a reign of terror. He traps a beautiful Mongol princess and masters a new Yin and Yang-combined martial arts technique, becoming almost invincible. Zhang Wuji has to put an end to Song Qingshu's rampage.

Cast
 Derek Yee as Zhang Wuji
 Ti Lung as Tiezhen
 Alex Man as Song Qingshu
 Cherie Chung as Mongol princess
 Leanne Liu as Zhou Zhiruo
 Ku Feng as Zhu Yuanzhang
 Lo Lieh as Xie Xun
 Lung Tien-hsiang as Wei Yixiao
 Dang Wai-ho as Yang Xiao
 Yuen Wah as Fan Yao
 Elvis Tsui as Weizhen
 Kwan Fung
 Yeung Chi-hing
 Shum Lo
 Yuen Bun
 Lam Wai
 Hung San-nam
 Ko Hung
 Tam Bo
 Lee Fat-yuen

References

External links
 
 

1984 films
Films based on works by Jin Yong
Hong Kong martial arts films
Works based on The Heaven Sword and Dragon Saber
Wuxia films
Films set in the Yuan dynasty
Shaw Brothers Studio films
Films about rebels
Films directed by Chor Yuen
1980s Hong Kong films